Cryptogemma longicostata is a species of sea snail, a marine gastropod mollusk in the family Turridae, the turrids.

Description

Distribution
This species was found on the Kuril–Kamchatka Trench, Northern Pacific.

References

 Sysoev, AV, and YU I. Kantor (1986). "Espèces abyssales rares et nouvelles de la famille Turridae (Gastropoda, Toxoglossa) dans la partie nord de l'Océan Pacifique." Zoologičeskij žurnal 65.10 (1986): 1457-1469.
 Fukumori, Hiroaki, et al. "Deepest known gastropod fauna: Species composition and distribution in the Kuril–Kamchatka Trench." Progress in Oceanography 178 (2019): 102176.

External links
 

longicostata
Gastropods described in 1986